This is a list of French generals who died during the First World War (1914–1918).  The list is published by the French war graves authority Le Souvenir français and includes all generals they have determined to have mort pour la France.  It includes those killed in action or died of wounds but also those who died from illness contracted on active duty.  The list includes generals who died as late as 1923.

Background 
In 1914 the French Army of around 770,000 men maintained 21 army corps of around two divisions each.  There were a total of 47 infantry and 10 cavalry divisions which included 92 infantry brigades, 38 cavalry brigades and 21 field artillery brigades; these formations would typically have been commanded by a general officer.  By the war's end in 1918 the army had expanded to 3,000,000 men in 113 divisions.  During that time it had suffered 1,327,000 men killed, died of wounds or missing and presumed dead.

There were only two general officer ranks in the French Army, that of général de brigade (equivalent to brigadier-general) and of général de division (equivalent to major-general).  Généraux de brigade (and sometimes colonels) commanded brigades and sub-divisions of larger units, while armies, corps and divisions were led by généraux de division; additional generals were required to serve in staff positions.  The military distinction (not rank) of Marshal of France, held for life, was sometimes granted to senior generals.  At the start of the war in 1914 there had been no living marshals since the death of François Certain de Canrobert in 1895.  During the course of the war it would be awarded to two generals, Joseph Joffre and Ferdinand Foch, with Philippe Pétain receiving the honour shortly after the 11 November 1918 armistice.  Five other generals were granted the honour in the early 1920s, in two cases (Michel-Joseph Maunoury and Joseph Gallieni) the men had died as generals during the war.

Age limits for active service were 62 years for généraux de brigade and 65 for généraux de division.  Generals tended to be towards the upper limit of these ages, with all army commanders in August 1914 aged between 61 and 64.  Low pay and slow career progression led to a shortage of officers and non-commissioned officers in the pre-war French army.  At the outbreak of the war the army was short 400 officers of all ranks.  It could put into the field only 120 généraux de division out of a requirement of 160 and just 220 généraux de brigade, out of a requirement of 260.  Additional generals were recalled from retirement, though many of these were elderly and ill suited for campaigning.

List  
The Le Souvenir français is responsible for maintaining French war memorials and cemeteries and providing information about war dead.  It maintains a list of military personnel determined to have mort pour la France ("died for France"), a designation granted under the French  ("code for military disability pensions and victims of war").  The designation is granted for those killed in action, died of wounds, died from illness contracted on active duty or executed by an occupying power among other categories.

This list is extracted from Le Souvenir français member Gérard Gehin's Livre d'or des officiers superieurs morts pour la France guerre 14-18 ("Golden book of superior officers who died for France in the 1914-1918 war"). Gehin's work lists all officers of lieutenant-colonel rank or above, but only the 81 officers who held general rank at the time of their death are listed here. It includes some officers who died as late as 1923 where Le Souvenir français has determined they qualify as mort pour la France. Where details are missing from Gehin's list additional information has been taken from the sources cited.

French historian Laurent Guillemot published a book, La Liste de Foch (French: Foch's list), in 2017 that discussed the French generals who died during the war.  He notes that Foch prepared a list of 40 he deemed to have been killed in action (plus Admiral Victor-Baptistin Senès), whose names were inscribed on the memorial at Les Invalides.  To this list Guillemot adds Général de Brigade Corneille Trumelet-Faber who died of wounds following a German shell explosion.  Guillemot noted that the average age of the men he listed was 56.5 years and that two-thirds were killed by shell fire and the remainder shot.  He notes that around 76 British generals were killed in the war, 2 Belgian, 2 Italian and 2 Romanians.  On the opposing side he notes around 70 German generals, 40 Austro-Hungarian and one Ottoman killed.

In the list below generals listed by Foch are denoted in red.

See also 
List of generals of the British Empire who died during the First World War

References 

Lists of French military personnel
Lists of people killed in World War I
Lists of generals
France in World War I